Eva-Lisa "Pipsan" Saarinen Swanson (March 31, 1905 – October 23, 1979) was a Finnish-American industrial, interior, and textile designer based in Michigan. She was known for her contemporary furniture, textile, and product designs.

Early life and education
Swanson was born in Kirkkonummi, Finland to architect Eliel Saarinen and noted textile designer and sculptor Loja Saarinen. She was the elder sister of celebrated architect Eero Saarinen. She studied weaving, ceramics, and fabric design at Atheneum Art School and University of Helsinki. She moved to the United States with her family in 1923. They eventually settled in Bloomfield Hills when her father became the resident architect at The Cranbrook Academy of Art.

She married architect J. Robert (Bob) F. Swanson in 1926.

Work
Swanson was part of a strong period of educators and students at Cranbrook known as the "golden moment". She taught the first class on contemporary furniture design at Cranbrook. In 1935, both she and her mother had their textiles exhibited at the Metropolitan Museum of Art. Swanson left the academy to work with her husband. They formed Swanson Associates in 1947. It was the first architectural firm that also included interior design services. Swanson was typically responsible for the interior design. Among the projects on which they worked was The Koebel House, located in Grosse Pointe, Michigan.

One of her most noted products was a line of indoor outdoor furniture known as the Sol-Air Group, produced by Ficks Reed. She created various other furnishings and decorative items including lamps, glassware, fabrics, and pottery with Swanson and her brothers. Swanson was also an industrial design consultant for clients including Barwick Mills, Goodall Fabrics, and the Pittsburgh Plate Glass Company.

She was named an honorary member of the American Institute of Architects in 1972.

Swanson died at her home in Bloomfield Township, Michigan in 1979 following a short illness.

References

See also: Eero Saarinen An Architecture of Multiplicity by Antonio Román, 2006.

1905 births
1979 deaths
American industrial designers
American textile designers
American women interior designers
Finnish industrial designers
Finnish interior designers
Finnish textile artists
University of Helsinki alumni
People from Kirkkonummi
Finnish emigrants to the United States
Cranbrook Educational Community
20th-century American women
Finnish-American culture in Michigan